Priscila Bosio (born ) is an Argentine female volleyball player. She is part of the Argentina women's national volleyball team.

She participated in the 2015 FIVB Volleyball World Grand Prix, and 2018 FIVB Volleyball Women's Nations League
 At club level she played for GELP in 2015, Nautico Sportivo Avellaneda in 2021 and    nowadays Feel Volley Alconbendas

References

1994 births
Living people
Argentine women's volleyball players
Place of birth missing (living people)